Bishop George M. Conroy (1832–1878) was an Irish Roman Catholic priest and bishop.

From Dundalk, County Louth, he was educated in Armagh, before at the age of 17 going to Rome to study for the priesthood, where he was ordained on 6 June 1857.  Following ordination, he was appointed to All Hallows College, Dublin where he taught as Professor of Dogma, from 1857 to 1866. In 1866, he was appointed secretary to the Archbishop of Dublin, Cardinal Cullen, whom he had known from his time in Armagh, and Dr. Conroy also began lecturing in Theology in Clonliffe College, he also served as joint editor of the Irish Ecclesiastical Record from its foundation 1864 until 1871, when he was appointed a Bishop. Following his appointment to Ardagh and Clonmacnoise in 1871, Bishop Conroy, continued to support Cardinal Cullens reforms, and implemented the changes from the 1875 Synod of Maynooth.

He served as Bishop of Ardagh and Clonmacnoise from 1871 until his death. Appointed by Pope Pius IX to be the first apostolic delegate to Canada, he went there in 1877. He died on his way back to Europe on 4 August 1878, in St. John's, Newfoundland.

References

1832 births
1878 deaths
People from County Louth
Roman Catholic bishops of Ardagh and Clonmacnoise